Pete Heller is an English electronic and house music producer from Brighton, England.

Biography
He is recognised in the dance community for his solo work, and his remixes with frequent collaborator Terry Farley.  As a duo, they have released popular tunes under the names Heller & Farley Project (or Farley & Heller), Fire Island plus The Look and Feel.  In 1996, they released "Ultra Flava", a No. 3 hit on the US Billboard Hot Dance Music/Club Play chart.  The track also peaked at No. 22 on the UK Singles Chart. In 2000, he remixed Moby's song "South Side" which charted at No. 14 on the U.S. Billboard Hot 100, making it Moby's most successful single in the US.

On his own, Heller hit No. 1 on the US Hot Dance Music/Club Play chart with "Big Love", which held the top spot for three weeks and also was ranked by Billboard as the #1 dance song of 1999. The same track peaked at No. 12 in the UK.

In addition, Heller remixed the Chemical Brothers' 2002 release "Star Guitar", which reached No. 8 on the UK chart.

In 2004, Heller launched his own record label, Phela Recordings, as a platform for his own productions and collaborations with other artists.

Remixes

Felix - "Don't You Want Me"
Moby - "South Side"
Daft Punk - "Harder, Better, Faster, Stronger"
The Chemical Brothers - "Star Guitar"
Fatboy Slim - "Song for Shelter"
Par Ney De Castro - "Ba-Tu-Ca-Da! - (Pete Heller Big Love From Rio Mix)"

See also
List of number-one dance hits (United States)
List of artists who reached number one on the US Dance chart

References

External links

 'Big Love (Eat Me Edit)' Review by Trancefixxed

Remixers
English electronic musicians
Musicians from Brighton and Hove
English record producers
English house musicians
Living people
Electronic dance music DJs
Year of birth missing (living people)